The 1975 State of the Union address was given by President Gerald Ford to a joint session of the 94th United States Congress on January 15, 1975. The speech was the first State of the Union address of President Ford's tenure as president.

The president discussed the national debt, taxes, the federal budget and the energy crisis. The speech lasted 41:00 and consisted of 4,126 words. The address was broadcast live on radio and television.

The Democratic Party response was delivered by Senator Hubert Humphrey of Minnesota and the Speaker of the House Carl Albert of Oklahoma.

See also
United States House of Representatives elections, 1974
1973–75 recession

References

External links
(full transcript), The American Presidency Project, UC Santa Barbara
(full video and audio), Miller Center of Public Affairs, University of Virginia.

Presidency of Gerald Ford
State of the Union addresses
94th United States Congress
State of the Union Address
State of the Union Address
State of the Union Address
January 1975 events in the United States